Weissenburg is an unincorporated rural community in Woolwich Township, Waterloo, Ontario, Canada.

Weissenburg is located at the crossroads of Line 86 and Sideroad 16.

History
Pioneer farmers and wagon drivers travelling between Woolwich Township and Guelph would stop at Weissenburg to water their horses and refresh themselves.

The pioneer settlement had a tavern, blacksmith shop, grocery store, two hotels, and a nearby school.  A post office operated from 1875 to 1913.

In 1910, Weissenburg had daily stage coach service, and a population of about 100.

See also

 List of unincorporated communities in Ontario

References

Communities in the Regional Municipality of Waterloo
Woolwich, Ontario